Music Man is a 1948 American film directed by Will Jason.

Jimmy Dorsey and His Orchestra appear.

Plot

Cast

References

External links
Music Man at IMDb
Music Man at TCMDB

1948 films
1948 musical comedy films
1940s teen films
American black-and-white films
American musical comedy films
Monogram Pictures films
Films directed by Will Jason
1940s English-language films
1940s American films